Dana van Dreven (born 8 July 1974), also known as DJ Lady Dana, is a Dutch hardstyle and previously gabber DJ and producer.

Van Dreven was born in Amsterdam. She started playing gabber in 1993 and though it was never her intention to become a DJ, she did, and is now the most popular female DJ on the Dutch hard dance scene. She achieved the highest ranking spot as a hard dance DJ in the British Mixmag top 100, which she first entered at number fifty-five.

She suffered a hiatus starting in 2010, after a series of medical conditions: she was first diagnosed with burnout after a series of anxiety episodes. After a year of recovery, she was discovered with a melanoma and had her lymph glands removed. After the operation, she had pain in her shoulder, as a result of a pinched nerve, and she was diagnosed with nerve damage, causing a constant pulsating pain in her left arm. After two and a half years, she returned to the last Thunderdome festival, where she performed a set using mostly one arm.

Albums (solo)
2002 ID&T Presents Dana
2004 Dj Dana
2006 Just Dana
2008 Havido Dana

References

External links
Danamite — her own record label
"Official Facebook"

1974 births
Living people
Club DJs
Musicians from Amsterdam
Dutch DJs
Women DJs
Hardstyle musicians
Electronic dance music DJs
21st-century women musicians